The Works Tour was the tenth headlining concert tour by the British rock band Queen to promote their successful 1984 album The Works. During the tour, Queen participated in the Rock in Rio festival in 1985; the concert was released on VHS. The band released a DVD from a concert in Tokyo titled We Are the Champions: Final Live in Japan, but the name of the concert was incorrect as the band performed 2 further concerts after Tokyo in Nagoya and Osaka.

Stage design
The stage design was based on a scene from Fritz Lang's Metropolis with huge rotating cog-wheels at the rear of the stage and a brightly lit cityscape. Due to a prior ligament damage in his knee, it was somewhat of a challenge for Mercury to navigate the complex set of multiple levels and stairs. Eventually, in Hanover, Mercury fell down the stairs during the performance of "Hammer to Fall". He was only able to play "Bohemian Rhapsody", "We Will Rock You", and "We Are the Champions" afterwards, shortening the concert somewhat. Due to Mercury's injury, May played the first bars of "We Will Rock You" out of anxiety to get Mercury to the hospital.

Breaking apartheid embargo
Queen scheduled 12 performances in Bophuthatswana, South Africa, at the Sun City Super Bowl in October 1984. Due to the apartheid policy of South Africa the United Nations requested entertainers to boycott the country and the Britain's Musicians’ Union banned any of its members from performing in Sun City. Queen played anyway, despite the controversy, though several shows were cancelled after Mercury's voice gave out after three days live performances.  The show was extended to a third weekend.

Personnel
Freddie Mercury – lead vocals, piano, rhythm guitar (on "Crazy Little Thing Called Love" )
Brian May – electric and acoustic guitars, backing vocals
Roger Taylor – drums, backing vocals
John Deacon – bass guitar, rhythm guitar (on "Staying Power"), backing vocals
Additional musicians:
Spike Edney – keyboards, piano, backing vocals, rhythm guitar (on "Hammer to Fall")

Setlist
This setlist is representative of the performance on 8 September 1984 in London. It does not represent all the setlists for the duration of the tour.

"Machines (Or 'Back to Humans)" [Intro]
"Tear It Up"
"Tie Your Mother Down"
"Under Pressure"
"Somebody to Love"
"Killer Queen"
"Seven Seas of Rhye"
"Keep Yourself Alive"
"Liar"
"It's a Hard Life"
"Staying Power"
"Dragon Attack"
"Now I'm Here"
"Is This the World We Created...?"
"Love of My Life"
"Stone Cold Crazy"
"Great King Rat"
"Keyboard Solo"/"Guitar Solo"/"Brighton Rock"
"Another One Bites the Dust"
"Hammer to Fall"
"Crazy Little Thing Called Love"
"Bohemian Rhapsody"
"Radio Ga Ga"
Encore
"I Want to Break Free"
"Jailhouse Rock"
"We Will Rock You"
"We Are the Champions"
"God Save the Queen" [Outro]

Tour dates

Cancelled shows

Notes

References

External links
Queen Concerts
Queenlive.ca

Queen (band) concert tours
1984 concert tours
1985 concert tours